The seventh season of Ídolos  aired in 2022. Sara Matos was the presenter. This season, the judges are Martim Sousa Tavares, Joana Marques, Ana Bacalhau and Tatanka.

Live shows

Top 15 - This is Me
The six finalists with the highest number of votes (by the viewers) were automatically in the Top 10. Among the remaining 9, the judges have chosen 4 contestants to keep.

Top 10 - Love Songs 
The two contestants with the lowest amount of votes were eliminated. Even though the results were revealed arbitrarily, Beatriz Almeida was the last person to be called safe.

Top 8 - Dance Hits 
The contestant with the lowest amount of votes was eliminated. Even though the results were revealed arbitrarily, Juliana Anjo was the last person to be called safe.

Top 7 - Portuguese Music 
The contestant with the lowest amount of votes was eliminated.

Top 6 - Rock In Rio / Judges' Choice 
The contestant with the lowest amount of votes was eliminated.

Top 5 - Year 1992 / 21st Century (Semifinals)

Top 4 - Finale

Elimination chart 

 Being safe last does not necessarily mean that the person was among the bottom contestants.
 The top 6 contestants were revealled with no particular order.

References

Ídolos (Portuguese TV series)
2022 television seasons